The Kombio-Arapeshan languages constitute a branch of the Torricelli language family according to Laycock (1975), but this is doubted by Foley (2018).

Languages
Kombio-Arapeshan
Kombian languages: Eitiep, Lou, Kombio, Yambes, Aruek, Wom
Arapeshan languages: Mountain Arapesh (Bukiyip), Southern Arapesh (Muhiang / Mufian), Bumbita (Weri), Abu'

References